Lysychanskyi is a settlement in Sievierodonetsk Raion (district) in Luhansk Oblast of eastern Ukraine.

Until 18 July 2020, Lysychanskyi was located in Popasna Raion. The municipality was abolished that day as part of the administrative reform of Ukraine and the number of raions of Luhansk Oblast was reduced to eight, of which only four were controlled by the government. Popasna Raion was merged into Sievierodonetsk Raion.

References

Villages in Sievierodonetsk Raion